Adiós is a municipality in the province and autonomous community of Navarre, Spain. , the population was 147.

References

External links
 ADIOS in the Bernardo Estornés Lasa - Auñamendi Encyclopedia (Euskomedia Fundazioa) 

Municipalities in Navarre